Founded in 1899, the Colorado and Wyoming Railway  is a subsidiary of the Evraz North America.  It hauls coal, ore and steel products on about five miles of track inside ERVAZ - Pueblo, CO Steel Mills facility (formerly Colorado Fuel and Iron's Minnequa plant) in Pueblo, Colorado, and connects to the Union Pacific Railroad and the BNSF Railway. The railway used to be a much larger railroad, serving the CF&I's mills, steel plants that were the only vertically integrated steel mills west of the Rockies until World War II.

References

Colorado railroads
Railway companies established in 1899
Former Class I railroads in the United States
Switching and terminal railroads
Defunct Wyoming railroads
1899 establishments in Wyoming
American companies established in 1899